Arsenic trioxide, sold under the brand name Trisenox among others, is an inorganic compound and medication. As an industrial chemical, its major uses include the manufacture of wood preservatives, pesticides, and glass. As a medication, it is used to treat a type of cancer known as acute promyelocytic leukemia. For this use it is given by injection into a vein.

Common side effects include vomiting, diarrhea, swelling, shortness of breath, and headaches. Severe side effects may include APL differentiation syndrome and heart problems. Use during pregnancy or breastfeeding may harm the baby. Arsenic trioxide has the formula . Its mechanism in treating cancer is not entirely clear.

Arsenic trioxide was approved for medical use in the United States in 2000. It is on the World Health Organization's List of Essential Medicines. Approximately 50,000 tonnes are produced a year. Due to its toxicity, a number of countries have regulations around its manufacture and sale.

Uses

Medical
Arsenic trioxide is used to treat a type of cancer known as acute promyelocytic leukemia (APL). It may be used both in cases that are unresponsive to other agents, such as all-trans retinoic acid (ATRA) or as part of the initial treatment of newly diagnosed cases. This initial treatment may include combination therapy of arsenic trioxide with all-trans retinoic acid (ATRA).

Effectiveness appears similar to Realgar/Indigo naturalis, which can be taken by mouth and is less expensive but is less available. It works by encouraging the proteosome breakdown of retinoic acid receptor alpha, by moving the protein on to the nuclear matrix and increasing ubiquitination.

In the 1970s, Chinese researcher Zhang Tingdong and colleagues discovered this use. It was approved for leukemia treatment in the United States in 2000. University of Hong Kong developed a liquid form of arsenic trioxide that can be given by mouth. Organoarsenic compounds, such as feed additives (roxarsone) and medication (neosalvarsan), are derived from arsenic trioxide.

Manufacturing
Industrial uses include usage as a precursor to forestry products, in colorless glass production, and in electronics. Being the main compound of arsenic, the trioxide is the precursor to elemental arsenic, arsenic alloys, and arsenide semiconductors. Bulk arsenic-based compounds sodium arsenite and sodium cacodylate are derived from the trioxide.

A variety of applications exploit arsenic's toxicity, including the use of the oxide as a wood preservative. Copper arsenates, which are derived from arsenic trioxide, are used on a large scale as a wood preservative in the U.S. and Malaysia, but such materials are banned in many parts of the world. This practice remains controversial. In combination with copper(II) acetate, arsenic trioxide gives the vibrant pigment known as Paris green used in paints and as a rodenticide. This application has been discontinued.

Alternative medicine
Despite the well known toxicity of arsenic, arsenic trioxide was used in traditional Chinese medicine, where it is known as pi-shuang. In homeopathy, it is called arsenicum album. Some discredited patent medicines, e.g., Fowler's solution, contained derivatives of arsenic oxide.

Toxicology

Arsenic trioxide is readily absorbed by the digestive system.  Ingestion of as little as 0.1 grams can be fatal.

Chronic arsenic poisoning is known as arsenicosis. This disorder affects workers in smelters, in populations whose drinking water contains high levels of arsenic (0.3–0.4 ppm), and in patients treated for long periods with arsenic-based pharmaceuticals. Similarly, studies on workers exposed in copper foundries in the U.S., Japan and Sweden indicate a risk of lung cancer 6–10 times higher for the most exposed workers compared with the general population. Long-term ingestion of arsenic trioxide either in drinking water or as a medical treatment can lead to skin cancer. Reproductive problems (high incidences of miscarriage, low birth weight, congenital deformations) have also been indicated in one study of women exposed to arsenic trioxide dust as employees or neighbours of a copper foundry.

In the U.S., the OSHA 1910.1018 occupational permissible exposure limit for inorganic arsenic compounds in breathing zone air is 0.010 mg/m3.

Production and occurrence

Arsenic trioxide can be generated via routine processing of arsenic compounds including the oxidation (combustion) of arsenic and arsenic-containing minerals in air. Illustrative is the roasting of orpiment, a typical arsenic sulfide ore.
2  + 9  → 2  + 6 
Most arsenic oxide is, however, obtained as a volatile by-product of the processing of other ores. For example, arsenopyrite, a common impurity in gold- and copper-containing ores, liberates arsenic trioxide upon heating in air. The processing of such minerals has led to numerous cases of poisonings, and after the mine is closed, the leftover trioxide waste will present environmental hazard (as was the case with the Giant Mine, for example). Only in China are arsenic ores intentionally mined.

In the laboratory, it is prepared by hydrolysis of arsenic trichloride:

 occurs naturally as two minerals, arsenolite (cubic) and claudetite (monoclinic). Both are relatively rare secondary minerals found in oxidation zones of As-rich ore deposits. Sheets of  stand for part of structures of the recently discovered minerals lucabindiite, and its sodium-analogue torrecillasite.

Properties and reactions
Arsenic trioxide is an amphoteric oxide, and its aqueous solutions are weakly acidic. Thus, it dissolves readily in alkaline solutions to give arsenites. It is less soluble in acids, although it will dissolve in hydrochloric acid.

With anhydrous HF and HCl, it gives  and the trichloride:
 (X = F, Cl)

Only with strong oxidizing agents such as ozone, hydrogen peroxide, and nitric acid does it yield arsenic pentoxide,  or its corresponding acid:

In terms of its resistance to oxidation, arsenic trioxide differs from phosphorus trioxide, which readily combusts to phosphorus pentoxide.

Reduction gives elemental arsenic or arsine depending on conditions:

This reaction is used in the Marsh test.

Structure 
Three forms (polymorphs) are known in the solid state:  a high temperature ( > 110 °C) cubic , containing molecular , and two related polymeric forms. The polymers, which both crystallize as monoclinic crystals, feature sheets of pyramidal  units that share O atoms.

Society and culture

Environmental effects
Smelting and related ore processing often generate arsenic trioxide, which poses a risk to the environment. For example, the Giant Mine in Canada processed substantial amounts of arsenopyrite-contaminated gold ores.

Arsenic poisoning in literature and society
The poisonous properties of arsenic are the subject of an extensive literature.

In Austria, there lived the so-called "arsenic eaters of Styria", who ingested doses far beyond the lethal dose of arsenic trioxide without any apparent harm. Arsenic is thought to enable strenuous work at high altitudes, e.g. in the Alps.

References

External links 
 
 Case Studies in Environmental Medicine: Arsenic Toxicity
 
 International Chemical Safety Card 0378
 Safety Data Sheet from American Elements
 NIOSH Pocket Guide to Chemical Hazards
 NTP Report on Carcinogens – Inorganic Arsenic Compounds
 

Adamantane-like molecules
Alchemical substances
Antineoplastic drugs
Arsenic(III) compounds
Hepatotoxins
IARC Group 1 carcinogens
Sesquioxides
World Health Organization essential medicines
Wikipedia medicine articles ready to translate
X